Synthetic things are composed of multiple parts, often with the implication that they are artificial. In particular, 'synthetic' may refer to:

Science
 Synthetic chemical or compound, produced by the process of chemical synthesis
 Synthetic organic compounds synthetic chemical compounds based on carbon (organic compounds).
 Synthetic peptide
 Synthetic biology
 Synthetic elements, chemical elements that are not naturally found on Earth and therefore have to be created in experiments

Industry
 Synthetic fuel
 Synthetic oil
 Synthetic marijuana
 Synthetic diamond
 Synthetic fibers, cloth or other material made from other substances than natural (animal, plant) materials

Other
 Synthetic position, a concept in finance
 Synthetic-aperture radar, a type or radar
 Analytic–synthetic distinction, in philosophy
 Synthetic language in linguistics, inflected or agglutinative languages
 Synthetic intelligence a term emphasizing that true intelligence expressed by computing machines is not an imitation or "artificial."
 Synthetic or constructed language, such as Esperanto
 Synthetic music, produced by a synthesizer, a machine to create artificial sound and music
 Synthetic chord in music theory
 Synthetic person or legal personality, characteristic of a non-human entity regarded by law as having the status of a person
 Synthetic data, are any data applicable to a given situation that are not obtained by direct measurement or from live system as described in synthetic data; terminology used in testing of software applications
 Synthetic monitoring, (also known as active monitoring) is website monitoring that is done using a web browser emulation or scripted recordings of web transactions
 Synthetic setae, emulate the anatomical processes found on various animals, including the feet of basilisk lizards and the toes of geckos
 "Synthetic", a song by Spineshank from The Height of Callousness, 2000

See also
Artificial (disambiguation)
Man-made (disambiguation)
Pharmaceutical drug
Plastic
Synthetic phonics
Synthetic rubber